The 1989 Bucknell Bison football team represented Bucknell University as a member of the Colonial League in the 1989 NCAA Division I-AA football season. They were led by first-year head coach Lou Maranzana and played their home games at Memorial Stadium in Lewisburg, Pennsylvania, rededicated as Christy Mathewson–Memorial Stadium on  September 30 in honor of one of the university's most famous alumni.

Schedule

References

Bucknell
Bucknell Bison football seasons
Bucknell Bison football